Quality Street can refer to:

 Quality Street (play), a play by J. M. Barrie
 Quality Street (1927 film), a 1927 film based on the play starring Marion Davies
 Quality Street (1937 film), a 1937 film based on the play, starring Katharine Hepburn
 Quality Street (confectionery), now manufactured by Nestlé
 Quality Street, a 1991 album by English indie band World of Twist
 Quality Street: A Seasonal Selection for All the Family, a 2013 album by English singer-songwriter Nick Lowe
 The Quality Street Gang, a criminal gang in Manchester, England, in the 1960s and 1970s
 A street in the village of Merstham
 A street in Davidson's Mains, Edinburgh
 A street in Leith, Edinburgh
 A Street in North Berwick, East Lothian